Kolonya (from Turkish: cologne) is a type of perfume. It is a famous product of Turkey, its country of origin. Kolonya is commonly used as a cologne, perfume, or as hand sanitizer. It is sometimes used as surrogate alcohol by poor alcoholics and teenagers usually resulting in fatal poisonings or blindness. Since 2018 Kolonya contains a bitterant agent. Cheap Kolonya or off brands contains methyl alcohol which is absorbable by skin causing Methanol toxicity, safe Kolonya is denatured with isopropyl alcohol instead of methanol.

Description

History 
Kolonya originated in Turkey - then part of the Ottoman Empire - in the 19th century, when cologne was first imported from Germany. The new perfume inspired new methods of scent-making, and supplanted rosewater as the primary fragrance in Turkey. Other scents were later added to the imported perfume, creating a uniquely Turkish product.

Kalem
Kolonya is composed of ethyl alcohol (between 60 and 80 percent), water, and fragrance. In addition to being used as a cologne, it is commonly used as a disinfectant or hand sanitizer. Traditionally, the aroma derives from fig blossoms, jasmine, rose or citrus ingredients (usually contains limonene and linalool). It has become increasingly popular in Turkey as a disinfectant following the 2020 Coronavirus pandemic.

References 

Perfumes
Goods manufactured in Turkey